Manwinder Singh Giaspura is an Indian politician and the MLA representing the Payal Assembly constituency in the Punjab Legislative Assembly. He is a member of the Aam Aadmi Party.  He was elected as the MLA in the 2022 Punjab Legislative Assembly election.

Career
Giaspura has been whistle blower in unearthing 1984 Hondh-Chillar massacre in Haryana.

Member of Legislative Assembly
He represents the Payal Assembly constituency as MLA in Punjab Assembly. The Aam Aadmi Party gained a strong 79% majority in the sixteenth Punjab Legislative Assembly by winning 92 out of 117 seats in the 2022 Punjab Legislative Assembly election. MP Bhagwant Mann was sworn in as Chief Minister on 16 March 2022.

Committee assignments of Punjab Legislative Assembly
Member (2022–23) Committee on Public Undertakings 
Member (2022–23) Committee on Panchayati Raj Institutions

Electoral performance

References

External links
 

Living people
Punjab, India MLAs 2022–2027
Aam Aadmi Party politicians from Punjab, India
Year of birth missing (living people)